Tenger, mountain in Mongolia
the Tengger Desert, a desert in China
Tengger (singer) (born 1960), a pop singer from Inner Mongolia